Richard Sterne may refer to:

Richard Sterne (bishop) (c. 1596–1683), Archbishop of York
Richard Sterne (golfer) (born 1981), South African golfer

See also
Richard Stern (disambiguation)
Richard Stearns (disambiguation)